Alis ferch Gruffudd ab Ieuan ap Llywelyn Fychan or Alis Wen ("Alice the White";  1520–?) was a 16th-century poet who wrote in Welsh. She wrote several englynion on matters of her personal and family life, and a cywydd aimed at reconciling two men.

Biography
She was the daughter of the "gentleman poet" Gruffudd ab Ieuan ap Llywelyn Fychan ( 1485–1553) of Llannerch and his first wife Sioned ferch Rhisiart ab Hywel of Mostyn (died 1540). Her two sisters, Catrin and Gwen, were also poets.

Alis composed a series of englynion discussing the kind of husband which she wished to marry and commenting on her father's second marriage in old age, and a cywydd to reconcile Dafydd Llwyd Llydan and Grigor y Moch.

She married David Lloyd ap Rhys of Vaynol in about 1540. They had four children:

 John Lloyd (died 1615), registrar of the diocese of St Asaph
 Thomas Lloyd of Vaynol (died 1602)
 William Lloyd, rector of Llanrhaeadr-ym-Mochnant, Llanfechain and Llanwrin, 1590–1600, and canon of St Asaph Cathedral, 1587–1600
 Edward Lloyd (died 1639), proctor in St Asaph.

References

1520s births
16th-century deaths
Year of birth uncertain
Year of death unknown
16th-century Welsh poets
16th-century Welsh women writers
Welsh women poets
Welsh-language poets